Kenswei Nsei (Kensense), also Nsei or Mesing (Bamessing), is a Grassfields Bantu language of Cameroon.

References

Ring languages
Languages of Cameroon